Stadionul Naţional de Rugby Arcul de Triumf (Triumphal Arch National Rugby Stadium) is a multi-purpose stadium in Bucharest, Romania. Being constructed on the site of the former stadium, it will host major rugby matches including home matches of the Romania national rugby union team. It will also host games at the 2021 UEFA European Under-19 Championship.

It is named after the nearby triumphal arch in Bucharest.

Austria, France and Ukraine's squads were based at the stadium during preparation for and between matches at UEFA Euro 2020.

The first sporting event held at the stadium was on 3 July 2021 when a rugby union crowd of 4,400 watched the summer internationals header, featuring Romania v Argentina and ended with a 17-24 loss.

References

Rugby union stadiums in Romania
Sports venues in Bucharest
Buildings and structures in Bucharest 
21st century in Bucharest
Multi-purpose stadiums in Romania